The following things all have the name Stroger:

People
 Bob Stroger, American blues singer and bassist
 John Stroger, first African-American president of the Cook County Board of Commissioners
 Todd Stroger, Cook County board president, son of John

Places
 John H. Stroger, Jr. Hospital of Cook County, hospital named after John Stroger

See also
 Strowger (disambiguation)